Giangiacomo Magnani (born 4 October 1995) is an Italian professional footballer who plays as a defender for Hellas Verona.

Career
Sassuolo acquired Magnani from Juventus at 27 July 2018, where he stayed one month.

On 31 January 2020, his loan to Brescia was terminated by mutual consent.

On 2 September 2020, Magnani joined Hellas Verona on loan until 30 June 2021, with a conditional obligation to buy.

On 16 January 2022, he joined Sampdoria on loan.

References

External links
 

Living people
1995 births
Sportspeople from Reggio Emilia
Italian footballers
Association football defenders
A.C. Reggiana 1919 players
F.C. Lumezzane V.G.Z. A.S.D. players
A.C. Perugia Calcio players
Siracusa Calcio players
U.S. Sassuolo Calcio players
Brescia Calcio players
Hellas Verona F.C. players
U.C. Sampdoria players
Serie A players
Serie B players
Serie C players
Serie D players
Footballers from Emilia-Romagna